Homesick is a 2015 Norwegian drama film directed by Anne Sewitsky. It was selected to be screened in the Contemporary World Cinema section of the 2015 Toronto International Film Festival. It was one of three films shortlisted by Norway to be their submission for the Academy Award for Best Foreign Language Film at the 88th Academy Awards, but it lost out to The Wave.

Plot
Charlotte (Ine Marie Wilmann) and Henrik (Simon J. Berger) are two half-siblings who grew up apart and end up falling in love after meeting for the first time in adulthood.

Cast
 Ine Marie Wilmann as Charlotte
 Simon J. Berger as Henrik
 Anneke von der Lippe as Anna
 Silje Storstein as Marte 
 Oddgeir Thune as Dag 
 Kari Onstad Winge as Kirsten
 Terje Strømdahl as Bjørn 
 Ida Marianne Vassbotn Klasson as Elin 
 Oscar Ducasse as Oscar 
 Arturo Tovar as Marco 
 Anna Dworak as Psykolog 
 Hans Rønningen as Erik 
 Even Nyhoff as Annas Nye Kjaereste

See also
Genetic sexual attraction

References

External links
 

2015 films
2015 drama films
Norwegian drama films
2010s Norwegian-language films
Incest in film